Blacklock is a surname of Scottish and English origin. Notable people with the surname include:

Ambrose Blacklock (1784–1866), Scottish-born farmer, physician and political figure in Upper Canada
Charlotte Blacklock (1857–1931), British suffragette, given a Hunger Strike Medal
Craig Blacklock (born 1954), nature photographer best known for his book The Lake Superior Images
Hugh Blacklock (1893–1954), professional American football offensive tackle in the National Football League
Judith Blacklock, author of five books on floral design, teacher, and regular arranger of the flowers at Kensington Palace
Nadine Blacklock (1953–1998), nature photographer best known for her detailed nature photography of the Lake Superior area
Nathan Blacklock (born 1976), Australian former rugby league, and rugby union footballer
Norman Blacklock KCVO OBE FRCS (1928–2006), surgeon in the Royal Navy, later professor of medicine at Manchester University
Ross Blacklock (born 1997), American football player
Thomas Blacklock (1721–1791), blind Scottish poet and ordained minister
Wendy Blacklock, Australia-based theatre and TV actor, who played Edie MacDonald in the 1970s TV soap opera Number 96
William James Blacklock (1816–1858), English landscape painter, painting scenery in Cumbria and the Scottish Borders

See also
Blacklock (horse), a Thoroughbred racehorse
Blacklock Elementary School, public elementary school in Langley, British Columbia part of School District 35 Langley
William Blacklock House, built in 1800, is one of the United States' most important Adamesque houses